The Duchess Countess: The Woman Who Scandalized Eighteenth-Century London is a 2022 book by Catherine Ostler that examines the life of Elizabeth Chudleigh. The book has five "positive" reviews, six "rave" reviews, and one "pan" review, according to review aggregator Book Marks.

References

2022 non-fiction books
English-language books
Atria Publishing Group books